FK Priekuli is a Latvian football club based in Priekuli. They compete in the second-highest division of Latvian football Latvian Second League. The club plays its home matches at the Cesu Olimpiskais Centrs stadium with capacity of 1,500 people.

History
"FK Priekuli" was founded in 2004. It participated in the 2nd league Vidzeme championship for several seasons, but in the 2013 and 2014 seasons they played in the 3rd league of the Vidzeme championship. In 2015, the club returned to the 2nd league.

The most successful season so far is 2015, when in the competition of eight teams "FK Priekuli" won the 4th place and won the right to play in the 2nd league final tournament, running for the first league championship. In its subgroup "FK Priekuli" remained in the second place and did not reach the final.

In 2014, a women's soccer team was formed. Football club "Priekuli" also has a youth football system, which is represented in eight different age groups.

First-team squad
As of 14 October, 2021.

Staff

Notes

External links 
FK Priekuli 
FK Priekuli 
FK Priekuli 
Levadia Pirita Cup 
Global Sports Archive 

Football clubs in Latvia
Association football clubs established in 2004
2004 establishments in Latvia